Bugcrowd is a crowdsourced security platform. It was founded in 2011 and in 2019 it was one of the largest bug bounty and vulnerability disclosure companies on the internet.
In March 2018 it secured $26 million in a Series C funding round led by Triangle Peak Partners. Bugcrowd announced Series D funding in April 2020 of $30 million led by previous investor Rally Ventures.

History 
Bugcrowd was founded in Sydney, Australia in 2012, it now has several different offices around the world like Sydney and London, with its main headquarters in San Francisco.

Bugcrowd focuses on a broad spectrum of penetration testing services for IoT, API, and even network but also attack surface management.

Funding 
Bugcrowd has raised a total of $78.7M in funding over 6 rounds. Their latest funding was raised on Apr 9, 2020 from a Series D round. The Series D round was raised by $30M led by Rally Ventures with the goal of being able to operate in more countries.  

Blackbird Ventures led funding for their Series B round with $15M raised in April 2016.   In this round of funding, Bugcrowd was looking at processing payments for Facebook’s bounty program.

Series A funding round took place in 2015 and was led by Costanoa Ventures, raising $6m.

Bugcrowd started off their seed funding in 2013 to increase their 3000 vetted security testers. This seed funding was primarily led by Rally Ventures and they were able to raise $1.6m.

Clients worked with 
Bugcrowd has an expansive list of clients they have worked with, which include Tesla, Atlassian, Fitbit, Square, Mastercard and others. They work with clients from big tech giants, to review platforms and the retail space like Amazon and eBay.  

Currently they’re working with 65 industries across 29 countries, with the latest funding, they are looking to expand more into Europe and Asia.  

Bugcrowd entered the financial sector by partnering with Western Union which they were able to test their bug bounty via private invite only. Western Union now has a bug bounty that is open to the public with rewards varying between $100 to $5000 depending on the bug.  

Continuing in the financial sector, Bugcrowd helped the big four bank NAB become one of the first banks in Australia to launch a bug bounty to be proactive in their security.  

Samsung has also used Bugcrowd, with Bugcrowd rewarding over $2m in rewards to those who found bugs in Samsung's security.  

In 2020 one of the lead VPN providers, ExpressVPN worked with Bugcrowd to ensure their clients privacy were protected while using a VPN. ExpressVPN were rewarding $100 to $2500 depending on the severity of vulnerabilities that were found, with 21 critical findings being identified upon the bug bounty program being released.

Job platform Seek has been using Bugcrowd since 2019 to continually look for bugs and any security vulnerabilities that may be throughout their platform with the highest reward being $10 thousand USD.

Bugcrowd is also a trailblazer in the Government & Military space, running programs for the U.S. DOD, the Air Force and DDS.

Further reading 
Bugcrowd Founder, Chairman & CTO is a partner in the open-source project disclose.io, which helps hackers and organizations make the Internet safer, together.  Additionally, Bugcrowd was named to the Forbes 2021 list of America's Best Startup Employers by Forbes and Statista Inc., the world-leading statistics portal and industry ranking provider. 

Bugcrowd have also founded their own university to help the public learn how to code, find bugs in security systems and how to patch them.

References

External links
 Company Website

Companies based in San Francisco
2011 establishments in California
Computer security companies